Augustus Edward White (1839–?) was a 19th-century Member of Parliament in New Zealand.

White was born in 1839. He contested the Akaroa electorate against William Sefton Moorhouse, the incumbent for the seat and Superintendent of the Province of Canterbury. White and Moorhouse received 51 and 32 votes, respectively; a majority of 19 for White, who was thus elected. At the time of his election, he was aged about 22, one of the youngest members in the country's parliamentary history. White resigned in 1863, and Lancelot Walker won the subsequent by-election.

White's house Blythcliffe in 37 Rue Balguerie, Akaroa, is presumed to have been designed by Samuel Farr based on drawings prepared by the Australian architect John Verge. Built in 1857, it was "the grandest house of its day in Akaroa". Originally registered as Category II in 1983, its classification was later changed to Category I.

References

Members of the New Zealand House of Representatives
Year of death missing
1839 births
New Zealand MPs for South Island electorates
Members of Canterbury provincial executive councils
19th-century New Zealand politicians